Laura Martignon (born 1952) is a Colombian and Italian professor and scientist. From 2003 until 2020 she served as a Professor of Mathematics and Mathematical Education at the Ludwigsburg University of Education. Until 2017 she was an Adjunct Scientist of the Max Planck Institute for Human Development in Berlin, where she previously worked as Senior Researcher. She also worked for ten years as a Mathematics Professor at the University of Brasilia and spent a period of one and a half years, as visiting scholar,  at the Hebrew University of Jerusalem.

Education 
Martignon obtained a bachelor's degree in Mathematics at Universidad Nacional de Colombia in Bogotà in 1971, a master's degree in Mathematics in 1975, and then graduated as a Doctor. rer. nat.  in Mathematics at the University of Tübingen in 1978.  She obtained her "emquadramento" (tenure) at the University of Brasilia in 1984 and her German Habilitation in Neuroinformatics at the University of Ulm, Germany, in 1998.

Academic contributions 

Martignon specialized in Mathematics Education and, as an applied mathematician, in mathematical modeling collaborating  in interdisciplinary scientific contexts. Together with physicist Thomas Seligman she applied functional analysis determining criteria for the applicability of integral transforms in n-body reaction calculations  and constructing Hilbert Spaces for the embedding of observables and of density matrices. In Neuroinformatics she modeled synchronization in the spiking events of groups of neurons: With her colleagues from Neuroscience Günther Palm, Sonja Grün, Ad Aertsen, Hermann von Hasseln, Gustavo Deco and the statistician Kathryn Laskey she set the basis for valid measurements of higher order synchronizations.

Her recent contributions have been in probabilistic reasoning, decision making and their connections with Mathematics Education. In 1995 she was one of the founding members of the ABC Center for Adaptive Behavior and Cognition, directed by Gerd Gigerenzer first in Munich (1995–1997) at the Max Planck Institute for Psychological Research and then in Berlin at the Max Planck Institute for Human Development ( since 1997). With colleagues from  ABC, mainly with Ulrich Hoffrage, she modeled the take-the-best heuristic as a non-compensatory linear model for comparison providing a first partial characterization of its ecological rationality . She is best known for having conceptualized and defined Fast-And-Frugal trees for classification and decision, mainly with Konstantinos Katsikopoulos and Jan Woike,  proving their fundamental properties, creating a theoretical bridge from natural frequencies  to fast and frugal heuristics for classification and decision.

Today her work on reasoning motivates most of her research in Mathematics Education. With Stefan Krauss, Rolf Biehler, Joachim Engel, Christoph Wassner and Sebastian Kuntze she has propagated the tenets of the ABC Group on the advantages of natural information formats and decision heuristics in school and as a topic of Math Education.  She has collaborated with Keith Stenning,  studying probability-free judgement based on defeasible logics and its impact for Mathematics Education . She has also done research on Gender in Mathematics Education leading a project on the topic at her University and founding the review journal Mathematik und Gender. For a period of 6 years she was the representative of the Working Group Frauen und Mathematik of the German Society of Mathematics Education (GDM) .

See also 
 Max Planck Institute for Human development
 Mathematics and Gender at the Ludwigsburg University

References

Selected publications

Books 
  Wer Wagt, Gewinnt? (2019) Laura Martignon & Ulrich Hoffrage, Hogrefe: Bern
  Nachhaltigkeit und Gerechtigkeit: Grundlagen und schulische Konsequenzen (2008) de Haan, G., Kamp, G., Lerch, A., Martignon, L., Müller-Christ, G., Nutzinger, H.G., Springer: New York
 Simple Heuristics that Make us Smart (1999) Gigerenzer, Todd and the ABC Group, Oxford University Press
 Matrizes Positivas – Impa Press.

Articles

Patents 
 Patents by Inventor Laura Martignon

External links 
Google Scholar
Interview with the SWR (South-West Radio Channel) on "Wie wir uns von Statistiken täuschen lassen" (How statistics deceive us)
Mathe bringt Glück -- im Deutschland funk
Gender Curricula

1952 births
Living people
20th-century Colombian mathematicians
Italian mathematicians
Women mathematicians
Academic staff of the University of Brasília
Academic staff of the Hebrew University of Jerusalem
National University of Colombia alumni
University of Tübingen alumni
Academic staff of the Ludwigsburg University of Education
21st-century Colombian mathematicians